Cooking with Stella is a 2009 film written by siblings Deepa Mehta and Dilip Mehta. The film is a light comedy about a Canadian diplomat (Lisa Ray) and her husband (Don McKellar) living in New Delhi, and their cook, Stella (Seema Biswas). Indian actress Shriya Saran makes a special appearance. Cooking with Stella was shot on location in New Delhi, and entered post-production in May 2008. It premiered at the Toronto International Film Festival on 16 September 2009. The film was also nominated at London Asian Film Festival under Best Crossover film category and best actress for Seema Biswas.

Plot
When a Canadian diplomat and her chef husband move into the Canadian High Commission in Delhi, they threaten to derail the schemes of the longtime cook Stella (Seema Biswas) who has been skimming off the top for years.

Cast
Seema Biswas as Stella
Lisa Ray
Don McKellar
Maury Chaykin

Awards

References

External links

2009 films
Canadian comedy films
Indian comedy films
2009 comedy films
Films shot in India
Cooking films
Films set in Delhi
Films about Indian Canadians
2000s English-language films
2000s Canadian films